Hercules and the Hydra is a c. 1475 tempera grassa on panel painting by Antonio del Pollaiuolo, forming a pair with the same artist's Hercules slaying Antaeus. Both works are now in the Galleria degli Uffizi in Florence. They show the influence of the Neoplatonic Academy, harking back to classical art and interpreting Greek and Roman myth in the light of Christian philosophy.

A letter from Antonio to Gentil Virginio Orsini dated from 13 July 1494 records three square paintings of the Labours of Hercules commissioned from Antonio and Piero del Pollaiuolo by Piero di Cosimo de' Medici, stating they had been produced thirty years earlier and that they were in the Palazzo Medici inventory after the death of Lorenzo the Magnificent. They were mentioned again in Raffaello Borghini's Riposo of 1584 before vanishing from the written record.

Possibly produced for a private study, the two works now in the Uffizi may be sketches for two of the works mentioned in the letter, copies after two of the works in that series or original works in their own right, possibly produced for the Medici and possibly relating to Antonio's bronze sculpture Hercules slaying Antaeus, which was commissioned by Lorenzo around 1475 and is now in the Museo nazionale del Bargello. The two Uffizi works are first definitively recorded in a 1609 inventory of works in the Gondi household in Florence, by which time they had been joined together to form a diptych despite originally being separate works with different horizon lines. They were lost during the Second World War but recovered in Los Angeles in 1963 by Rodolfo Siviero. They were restored in 1991.

References

Paintings in the collection of the Uffizi
Paintings depicting Heracles
Paintings by Antonio del Pollaiuolo
1475 paintings